Brent Leanrd Fullwood (born October 10, 1963), from Saint Cloud High School, is an American former professional football player who was a running back in the National Football League (NFL). He was drafted by the Green Bay Packers in the 1st round (4th pick) of the 1987 NFL Draft (the same year as fellow Auburn running backs Bo Jackson, Tommie Agee and Tim Jessie).  A 5'11", 209-pound running back from Auburn University, Fullwood played in four NFL seasons from 1987 to 1990 as well as finishing 6th in Heisman Trophy voting for his '86 SR season at Auburn. His best year as a pro came during the 1989 season when he led the Packers in rushing with 821 yards and was selected to the Pro Bowl.

References

1963 births
Living people
All-American college football players
American football running backs
Auburn Tigers football players
Cleveland Browns players
Green Bay Packers players
National Conference Pro Bowl players
People from Kissimmee, Florida
Players of American football from Florida
Sportspeople from Greater Orlando